Crescent Lake is a man made lake in Pensacola, Florida that was built for the Crescent Lake Subdivision that started selling homes in 1960. It is a natural spring fed lake that was created by a dam being built. The dam broke once in 1969 and was rebuilt. It broke again in 2014. In 2017 it was rebuilt.

Marcus Bayou
The Marcus Bayou is a stream and bayou that connects Crescent Lake to the outer lakes of the Crescent Lake. Including The Marcus Cottage Lakes and Turners Creek. The bayou also connects to the Perdido River on a very thin strip of water.

Bellshead Branch
The Bellshead Branch was built into the connection of the Crescent lake for the Marcus Cottage Lakes and Apartments. And proudly made a stream named the Marcus Bayou.

Turners Creek
Turners Lake is a private owned lake by Turner Apartments that connects to the Marcus Bayou.

External links
Crescent Lake Apartments for Rent (Apartment Finder.com)
Marcus Pointe Golf Club (Golf South Online)

Pensacola, Florida
Reservoirs in Florida
Lakes of Escambia County, Florida
1960s establishments in Florida